Areka (Ge'ez: አረካ) is city in southern Ethiopia. Located in some 300 kilometres southwest of the capital, Addis Ababa. It is the administrative center of Boloso Sore woreda.

Areka is served by a sub-office of the Ethiopian postal service. Areka was founded in 1959, and a primary school opened in the town in 1962. The Ethiopian Institute of Agricultural Research opened a center in Areka in 1985 dedicated to improving the yield of enset.

Demographics 
Based on figures from the Central Statistical Agency in 2020, this town has an estimated total population of 80,693 of whom 38,880 are men and 41,813 are women

Climate 
Areka features a Tropical Savanna Climate with average rainfall reaches 1290 mm.

Notes 

Wolayita
Populated places in the Southern Nations, Nationalities, and Peoples' Region
Cities and towns in Wolayita Zone
Cities and towns in Ethiopia
Ethiopia